
Year 322 (CCCXXII) was a common year starting on Monday (link will display the full calendar) of the Julian calendar. At the time, it was known as the Year of the Consulship of Probianus and Iulianus (or, less frequently, year 1075 Ab urbe condita). The denomination 322 for this year has been used since the early medieval period, when the Anno Domini calendar era became the prevalent method in Europe for naming years.

Events 
 By topic 
 Technology 
 The first dependable representation of a horse rider with paired stirrups is found in China, in a Jin Dynasty tomb.

Births 
 Kang of Jin (or Shitong), Chinese emperor (d. 344)
 Xun Xian (or Lingze), Chinese general (d. 359)

Deaths 
 Philogonius (or Filogonius), bishop of Antioch
 Rabbah bar Rav Huna, Jewish Talmudist
 Xu Kan, Chinese bandit leader and warlord
 Yang Xianrong, Chinese empress

References